Maxime Moreels (born 12 June 1991) is a Belgian badminton player. He won the men's doubles title at the 2012 Belgian National Championships, and also the runner-up in the singles event from 2011-2017. In 2016, he won his first international title at the Zambia International tournament. He educated at the Haute Ecole Libre Mosane, and competed at the 2013 Summer Universiade in Kazan, Russia.

Achievements

BWF International Challenge/Series (3 titles, 3 runners-up) 
Men's singles

  BWF International Challenge tournament
  BWF International Series tournament
  BWF Future Series tournament

References

External links 
 

Living people
1991 births
People from Nivelles
Belgian male badminton players
Badminton players at the 2019 European Games
European Games competitors for Belgium
Sportspeople from Walloon Brabant